مجلة مشاهير العراق 
 

https://t.me/celebrities_iraqi

Mashaher Al Iraq (often called Celebrities of Iraq ) (Arabic: وكالة  مشاهير العراق) is an Iraqi magazine published weekly from Baghdad. The magazine that was first published in 2008 as an entertainment and sports magazine.

History
Mashaher Al Iraq, founded and published by Alaa Yousif, is a magazine that deals with artists, singers, musicians, actors and sports. It was first published on 9 January 2008.

See also
Layla

References

External links
 Mashaher Al Iraq Official account on Instagram Mashaher Al Iraq

2008 establishments in Iraq
Arabic-language magazines
Entertainment magazines
Magazines published in Iraq
Magazines established in 2008
Mass media in Baghdad
Weekly magazines